Ait Saadelli is a commune in Khénifra Province, Béni Mellal-Khénifra, Morocco. At the time of the 2004 census, the commune had a total population of 2621 people living in 486 households.

References

Populated places in Khénifra Province
Rural communes of Béni Mellal-Khénifra